Takamatsu is a Japanese surname. Notable people with the surname include:

Prince Takamatsu (1905–1987), Japanese prince
Princess Takamatsu (1911–2004), Japanese princess, the wife of Prince Takamatsu
Daiki Takamatsu (born 1981), Japanese football player
Jiro Takamatsu (1936–1998), Japanese artist
Kinnosuke Takamatsu (1898–1979), Japanese actor
Masahiro Takamatsu (born 1982), Japanese judo player
Satoshi Takamatsu (born 1963), Japanese advertisement entrepreneur
Shin Takamatsu (born 1948), Japanese architect
Shinji Takamatsu (born 1961), Japanese animator and screenwriter
Toshitsugu Takamatsu (1889–1972), Japanese martial artist, "The Last Shinobi"
, Japanese swimmer

Japanese-language surnames